Deadsoul Tribe were an Austrian progressive metal band founded by Devon Graves (known as 'Buddy Lackey') from Psychotic Waltz.

Biography
Deadsoul Tribe was formed by Devon Graves in 2000.  Graves was originally the vocalist for another progressive metal band, Psychotic Waltz, where he was credited as Buddy Lackey, but departed from the group in 1997, claiming that he felt himself to be the band's "weakest link". In Deadsoul Tribe Graves serves as the principal songwriter, lead vocalist and guitarist as well as the producer on all of its releases.  

The remainder of the band consisted of Adel Moustafa on drums and Roland Ivenz on bass, with Roland "Rollz" Kerschbaumer, who joined the band in 2002, providing additional guitar work. The band's sound is characterized by heavy usage of tribal rhythms, dark atmospherics and unusual time signatures. 

Several Deadsoul Tribe tracks, such as "Black Smoke and Mirrors" on A Murder of Crows and "Toy Rockets" on The January Tree feature Devon Graves on flute, an instrument he picked up largely due to his admiration for Jethro Tull frontman Ian Anderson.

The band's fifth studio album, A Lullaby for the Devil, was released on September 11, 2007.

On November 20, 2009, the band split up.

Discography

Studio albums
 Deadsoul Tribe (2002)
 A Murder of Crows (2003)
 The January Tree (2004)
 The Dead Word (2005)
 A Lullaby for the Devil (2007)

Band members
 Devon Graves − vocals, guitar, keyboards, flute (2000− 2009)
 Adel Moustafa − drums (2000− 2009)
 Roland Ivenz − bass guitar (2000− 2009)
 Roland "Rollz" Kerschbaumer − rhythm guitar (2002− 2009)
 Volker Wiltschko − guitar (2000−2004)

See also

Related Genres
 Progressive metal
 Progressive rock
 Neo-progressive rock

Related bands
 Psychotic Waltz

References

 *

External links

 Deadsoul Tribe Official Website
 Deadsoul Tribe at InsideOut European
 Deadsoul Tribe at InsideOut Music America
 Obnoxious Listeners: Deadsoul Tribe
 Interview with drummer Adel Moustafa Lebmetal.com

Progressive metal musical groups
Austrian heavy metal musical groups
Musical groups established in 2000
Inside Out Music artists